is a passenger railway station located in Kawasaki-ku, Kawasaki, Kanagawa Prefecture, Japan, operated by East Japan Railway Company (JR East).

Lines

Station layout

The station consists of two opposed side platforms serving two tracks, connected by a level crossing. The station is unattended.

Platforms

History
Musashi-Shiraishi Station was opened on 10 March 1926 as a station on the privately held  initially for freight operations only. The station was closed on November 15, 1930 and reopened as the Musashi-Shiraishi Stop for passenger services only from 26 July 1931. It was elevated in status to that of a full station on 17 March 1936. The line was nationalized on 1 July 1943 and was absorbed into the Japanese Government Railways network. The station has been unstaffed since 1 March 1971. Upon the privatization of the Japanese National Railways (JNR) on 1 April 1987 the station has been operated by JR East.

The short platform (platforms 3 and 4) for the Ōkawa branch line was used until March 1996, when the branch line started operating three-car trains that were longer than the platform.

Passenger statistics
In fiscal 2008, the station was used by an average of 1,601 passengers daily (boarding passengers only).

Surrounding area
Fuji Electric Kawasaki Factory

See also
 List of railway stations in Japan

References

External links

 Musashi-Shiraishi Station (JR East) 

Railway stations in Kanagawa Prefecture
Railway stations in Japan opened in 1931
Railway stations in Kawasaki, Kanagawa